Richard M. Crooks is an American material chemist, currently the Robert A. Welch Foundation Chair of Materials Chemistry at the University of Texas at Austin.

References

Year of birth missing (living people)
Living people
University of Texas at Austin faculty
21st-century American chemists